Jacob Ragan (born 1995) is a British road and track cyclist.

Cycling career
Ragan became a British team champion when winning the Team Pursuit Championship at the 2013 British National Track Championships riding for Wheelbase Altura MGD.

References

1995 births
Living people
British male cyclists
British track cyclists
21st-century British people